Michel Koeniguer (12 August 1971 – 6 April 2021) was a French comic book artist.

Biography
Koeniguer was born on 12 August 1971 near Strasbourg.

Koeniguer worked on the  trilogy from 2005 to 2007 following the conclusion of Bushido. He then covered the Iraq War with the series The Bridge and the Vietnam War with the Bomb road and Misty Mission trilogies.

Michel Koeniguer died after a long illness and several surgeries on 6 April 2021 at the age of 49.

In the last months of his lifetime, Michel Koeniguer left finished the first 20 pages of Les Derniers Païens (third and last volume of Berlin sera notre tombeau), but also the script as well as the complete storyboards. This allowed comic artist Vincenzo Giordano to draw pages 21 to 48. This third and final volume was finally published posthumously in April 2022, one year after Koeniguer's death.

Published albums
Berlin sera notre tombeau
Neukölln (2019)
Furia Francese (2020)
Les Derniers Païens (2022, pages 21 to 48 drawn by Vincenzo Giordano)
Bomb Road
Da Nang (2010)
Chu Laï (2011)
Yankee station (2012)
The Bridge (2008)
Brooklyn 62nd
Latinos Requiem (2005)
Gangsta Rhaposdy (2006)
Hardcore Cop (2007)
Bushido
Les Derniers Seigneurs (2002)
Gaïjin-San (2003)
La mort des guerriers (2004)
Eightball hunter
Loser (2010)
Winner (2013)
Intégrale : Eightball hunter (2018)
Misty Mission
Sur la Terre comme au ciel (2016)
En enfer comme au paradis (2017)
Des ténèbres au purgatoire (2018)
Intégrale : Misty Mission (2019)

References

External links
Lambiek Comiclopedia article.

1971 births
2021 deaths
People from Bas-Rhin
University of Strasbourg alumni
Place of death missing
French comics artists